The 2014 Malaysia FA Cup Final was a football match which was played on 7 June 2014, to determine the champion of the 2014 Malaysia FA Cup.

The final was played between Pahang and Felda United. Pahang won 2–1 to win their second Malaysia FA Cup title after winning it in 2006, thus qualifying for the group stage of the 2015 AFC Cup.

Venue
The final was held at the Shah Alam Stadium in Shah Alam.

Road to final

Match details

Winner

References

Final
2014 in Malaysian football